The Wire is a weekly publication published by Joint Task Force Guantanamo, in Cuba—the unit responsible for the extrajudicial detention and interrogation of Guantanamo captives.

It publishes articles aimed at the camp's guards, interrogators, and administrative staff that offer a different perspective on the detention than that offered to the general public.

On 23 April 2007 twelve troopers from the 241st Mobile Public Affairs Detachment arrived in Guantanamo to take over Public Affairs at Guantanamo, including the publication of The Wire.

The publication and excerpts from it have been included in a fictionalized account of military life at Guantanamo.

References

Guantanamo Bay detention camp
United States Department of Defense publications